Anne Renaud is a Westmount, Quebec-based Canadian writer of nonfiction, fiction and poetry for children.

Early life and education 
Renaud was born in Valleyfield, Quebec. She "is a descendent of English, Irish, and French immigrants." While researching for her book Island of Hope and Sorrow, "she discovered that the ship on which her grandmother sailed to Canada in 1907 had made a stope at Grosse-Île before the family settled in Richmond, Quebec."

Career 
Renaud writes informative historical nonfiction for children on the subjects of immigration to Canada, World War II, and extraordinary life stories of actual people. Her books educate, entertain and inspire children, and have been short-listed for various awards, including the Hackmatack Children's Choice Award, the Red Maple, the Silver Birch and the Red Cedar.

She is also a regular contributor to children's magazines, such as Highlights for Children, Cricket, and Odyssey.

Awards and nominations 
Bank Street College of Education included Mr. Crum's Potato Predicament in their 2018 "Best Book for Kids & Teens" list, as did the Canadian Children's Book Centre.

Selected works 
 How the Sea Came to Marissa (Beyond Words, 2006)  
 Island of Hope and Sorrow: The Story of Grosse Ile (Lobster, 2007)  
 Pier 21: Stories from Near and Far (Lobster, 2008) 
 Missuk's Snow Geese, illustrated by Geneviève Côté (Simply Read Books, 2008) 
 Into the Mist: The Story of the Empress of Ireland (Dundurn, 2010) 
 Emma's Gems (2012)
 Mousseline Vole au Vent (Dominique et Compagnie, 2012) 
 The Extraordinary Life of Anna Swan (Cape Breton University, 2013)  
 Les pierres d'Emma (Dominique et Compagnie, 2013) 
 Amande lavande (Dominique et Compagnie, 2014) 
 The Boy Who Invented the Popsicle: The Cool Science Behind Frank Epperson's Famous Frozen Treat, illustrated by Milan Pavlović (2014)
 A Bloom of Friendship: The Story of the Canadian Tulip Festival (Whitecap Books, 2014)  
 Fania's Heart, illustrated by Richard Rudnicki (Second Story Press, 2018) 
 Mr. Crum's Potato Predicament, illustrated by Felicita Sala (2018)
 The True Tale of a Giantess: The Story of Anna Swan, illustrated by Marie Lafrance (Kids Can Press, 2018) 
 Albertine Petit-Brindamour déteste les choux de Bruxelles, illustrated by Élodie Duhameau (La courte échelle, 2020) 
 Gwendolyn's Pet Garden, illustrated by Rashin Kheiriyeh (Nancy Paulsen Books, 2021) )
 Je suis un livre, illustrated by Caroline Soucy (Bayard Canada, 2021) 
 Les oreilles de Chester, with Félix Girard (DE L'ISATIS, 2021) 
 Ferdinand Cheval: The Postman Who Delivered a Palace, illustrated by Ana Salopek (2022)

References

External links

 Defining Canada Interview with Anne Renaud
 Canadian Children's Book Centre
 Story time with Westmount author Anne Renaud, The Telegram News

Writers from Quebec
People from Salaberry-de-Valleyfield
People from Westmount, Quebec
Living people
Canadian women poets
21st-century Canadian poets
Canadian writers in French
21st-century Canadian women writers
Canadian women non-fiction writers
21st-century Canadian non-fiction writers
Year of birth missing (living people)